The Hostile Hospital  is the eighth novel in the children's book series A Series of Unfortunate Events by Lemony Snicket, the pseudonym of Daniel Handler. It takes place shortly after The Vile Village and is followed by a sequel, The Carnivorous Carnival.

Plot
After escaping the Village of Fowl Devotees, Violet, Klaus and Sunny Baudelaire arrive at a store to send a telegram to Mr. Poe, explaining their situation and pleading for help. The store's generous owner explains that a van of 'Volunteers Fighting Disease' arrives once every day for a gas refill. The van arrives, and the Baudelaires, thinking it to be the acronym 'V.F.D.', escape into it after the owner recognizes them as the accused murderers in the Daily Punctilio, an unreliable newspaper series.
The Baudelaires discover that Volunteers Fighting Diseases is a group of enthusiasts that visit Heimlich Hospital to increase the morale of patients, who believe that 'No News Is Good News', and therefore have never read The Daily Punctilio (and don't recognize the Baudelaires). One of the members suggests the Baudelaires seek a Library of Records to find their V.F.D.
The three then volunteer to aid Hal, a visually disabled elder who works in Heimlich Hospital's Library of Records. As he doesn't let them read any of the files, the Baudelaires regretfully trick him into giving them his keys to enter the library at night. While reading a file on the Baudelaires, in which only the thirteenth page remained since investigators have taken the rest, they discover that one of their parents may have survived or escaped the mansion's fire – however, Esmé Squalor enters the library, intent on destroying them and the files to clear Count Olaf's name in the crimes he has committed.
While escaping her clutches, Klaus and Sunny go through a small shaft, but Violet is taken when Count Olaf captures her and hides her from her siblings. The two, using the volunteers' list of patients, find out that Count Olaf has disguised Violet's name with another name with the use of anagrams, and track her down to the surgery room. Dr. Mattathias Madycle-Sküll (who is Count Olaf), the Head of Human Resources, announces via intercom that a craniectomy will be performed on Violet in an operation theatre. Klaus and Sunny disguise themselves as Dr. Tocuna and Nurse Flo to perform the surgery with the Hook-handed man and the Bald Man, both of which are recurring associates of Count Olaf.
While the two stall during the performance for Violet to wake up, Hal angrily accuses the Baudelaires of committing arson, and the hospital begins to burn to the ground. Violet eventually awakens, and they try to escape by hiding in a storage room while Olaf's henchperson of indeterminate gender tries to break in. They safely jump out of the window via Violet's makeshift bungee rope while Olaf's henchperson gets stuck and dies in the fire. They then hide in the trunk of Count Olaf's car after overhearing him discuss hunting down the Snicket files, which apparently contains crucial information on V.F.D, Jacques Snicket, and the Baudelaires.

Foreshadowing
The last picture of The Hostile Hospital shows Violet, Klaus, and Sunny are crammed into the trunk of Count Olaf's car. Among other items in the trunk are a crystal ball, a flier with "Madame Lulu" printed across the top, and a scrap of paper on which is drawn an eye. This is a reference to Madame Lulu in The Carnivorous Carnival.

Translations
 Brazilian Portuguese: "", Cia. das Letras, 2003, 
 Finnish: "Vihainen sairaala" (Translation for, "Hostile hospital") (An Angry Hospital), WSOY, 2004, 
 Italian: "L'ostile ospedale", Salani, 2004, 
 French: "Panique à la clinique" (Panic at the Clinic)
 Greek: "Το Νοσηρό Νοσοκομείο" ("The Sick Hospital")
 Japanese: "敵意ある病院", Soshisha, 2004,  
 Korean: "" (The Hospital of Death), Munhakdongnae Publishing Co, Ltd., 2009, 
 Norwegian: Det horrible hospitalet (The Horrible Hospital), Tor Edvin Dahl, Cappelen Damm, 2003, 
 Russian:  (Nightmarish Clinic), Azbuka, 2005, 
 Turkish  : "Dehşet Hastanesi" (Horror Hospital)
 Polish : "Szkodliwy szpital" (The Harmful Hospital)
 Thai: "โรงพยาบาลวิปริต", Nanmeebooks Teen, 2003,

Adaptation
The book was adapted into the seventh and eighth episodes of the second season of the television series adaptation produced by Netflix.

See also

Violet Baudelaire
Klaus Baudelaire
Sunny Baudelaire
Count Olaf
Lemony Snicket
Esmé Squalor
Hal (A Series of Unfortunate Events)
V.F.D.

References

2001 American novels
Books in A Series of Unfortunate Events
Novels set in hospitals
HarperCollins books
Sequel novels
2001 children's books
American novels adapted into television shows